Alba Fehérvár Kézilabda Club is a Hungarian women's handball team based in Székesfehérvár. Founded in 1968 by the merger of Máv Előre and VT Vasas, the club achieved their biggest success in 2005, when they were crowned of the EHF Cup winners, after beating domestic rivals Győri ETO KC in the finals. This is the first and so far the only major European title for the team.

Crest, colours, supporters

Naming history
 –1994: Alcoa Köfém SC
1994–1998: Cerbona SC
1998–1999: Cerbona-Alcoa SC
1999–2004: Cornexi-Alcoa
2004–2007: Cornexi-Alcoa-HSB Holding
2007–2009: Fehérép Alcoa FKC
2009–2010: Alcoa Fehérvár KC
2010–2011: Alcoa FKC RightPhone
2011–2012: Alcoa FKC
2012–2015: Fehérvár KC
2015–present: Alba Fehérvár KC

Kit manufacturers and Shirt sponsor
The following table shows in detail Fehérvár KC kit manufacturers and shirt sponsors by year:

Kits

Supporters and rivalries 
The supporters of the club are based in Székesfehérvár, in western part and capital of Fejér County, Hungary.

Fehérvár KC's arch-rival is the neighbouring club Dunaújvárosi Kohász KA and games between the clubs are considered as the "Fejér megyei derbi".

Team

Current squad
Squad for the 2022–23 season

 Head coach: Krisztián Józsa
 Goalkeeping coach: Péter Tatai
 Fittness coach: Alen Marosevic
 Masseur: László Bíró
 Physiotherapist: Hajnalka Horváth

 Chairman: Imre Balássi
 Technical manager: Dominika Járossy

Goalkeepers
 12  Molli Kubina
 16  Nikolett Tóth
 91  Tea Pijević
Left wingers
 17  Viktória Takó
 13  Bea Bojtos
Right wingers 
 97  Szonja Szemes
 11  Bruna Zrnić
Line players
 7  Nikolett Dubán
 99  Emőke Varga

Left backs
 23  Bianka Boldizsár 
 24  Borbála Besszer 
 14  Linda Utasi
 8  Katarina Stošić
 9  Laura Tolnai
 37  Réka Sulyok
Playmakers
 19  Tamara Smbatian
 25  Mana Ohyama 
Right backs
 4  Sára Afentáler

Transfers
Transfers for the 2023–24 season

 Joining

 Leaving
  Tea Pijević (GK) (to  SCM Gloria Buzău)

Previous Squads

Honours

Domestic competitions
Magyar Kupa (National Cup of Hungary)
 Finalist (1): 2005–06

European competitions
EHF Cup
Winners: 2005
Semifinalists: 2002, 2014

Recent seasons

Seasons in Nemzeti Bajnokság I: 28
Seasons in Nemzeti Bajnokság I/B: 16
Seasons in Nemzeti Bajnokság II: 3

In European competition
Alba Fehérvár score listed first. As of 21 November 2020.

Participations in EHF European League (EHF Cup): 12x
Participations in Challenge Cup (City Cup): 1x
Participations in Cup Winners' Cup: 2x

Notable players 

  Beatrix Balogh
  Rita Deli
  Anita Kulcsár
  Beáta Siti
  Borbála Tóth Harsányi
  Éva Kiss
  Eszter Siti
  Orsolya Herr
  Anita Herr
  Melinda Pastrovics
  Melinda Szikora
  Tamara Tilinger
  Viktória Csáki
  Melinda Vincze
  Szabina Mayer 
  Fruzsina Dávid-Azari
  Szabina Tápai 
  Tímea Sugár 
  Hortenzia Szrnka 
  Valéria Szabó 
  Virág Vaszari 
  Zsuzsanna Lovász 
  Krisztina Triscsuk 
  Andrea Farkas 
  Helga Németh 
  Ildiko Barbu
  Nicoleta Alexandrescu 
  Anca Grosu 
  Georgeta Năniţă   
  Alexandra do Nascimento
  Daniela Piedade
  Ana Amorim
  Adriana do Nascimento Lima
  Olga Gorshenina
  Yana Zhilinskayte
  Elena Kordyuk
  Biljana Filipović-Bandelier
  Jelena Živković-Lavko
  Slađana Đeric
  Natasa Savko
  Sanja Bogosavljevic
  Mayuko Ishitate
  Yuki Tanabe
  Laima Bernatavičiūtė
  Sonata Vijunaite
  Petra Valová 
  Elena Gjeorgjievska 
  Marija Shteriova
  Bobana Klikovac 
  Sandra Nikčević 
  Sonja Barjaktarovic 
  Claudine Mendy
  Armelle Attingré 
  Sabrina Zazai
  Nuria Benzal 
  Ana Nikšić 
  Ana Maruscec 
  Dora Lackovic 
  Olha Vashchuk

Coaches 
  Zsolt Barabás (1992–1993)
 József Zupkó (1993–1994)
 Tibor Babiczky (1994)
 Ervin Horváth (1995–1996)
 Mária Berzsenyi (1996–1999)
 Vilmos Köstner (1999–2001)
 Gyula Zsiga (2001–2002)
 Barabás Pánczél (2002)
 József Farkas (2003)
 Edina Szabó (2003–2006)
 József Vura (2006–2008)
 László Sótonyi (2008–2010)
 Attila Mihály (2010–2012)
 Csaba Konkoly (2012)
 Pal Oldrup Jensen (2012–2014)
 Botond Bakó (2014–2016)
 Rita Deli (2016–2020)
 Krisztián Józsa (2020–2021; 2022–present)
 Boris Dvoršek (2021–2022)

References

External links 
 Official website 
 

Hungarian handball clubs
Handball clubs established in 1968
Sport in Székesfehérvár